David Charles Hedley Calvert (8 May 1875 – 17 October 1924) was an Australian politician.

He was born at South Arm, Tasmania. In May 1924 he was elected to the Tasmanian Legislative Council as the independent member for Huon, but he died at Waterloo in October of that year. He was succeeded by his brother William.

References

1875 births
1924 deaths
Independent members of the Parliament of Tasmania
Members of the Tasmanian Legislative Council